Victor Alexander John Hope, 2nd Marquess of Linlithgow,  (24 September 1887 – 5 January 1952) was a British Unionist politician, agriculturalist, and colonial administrator. He served as Governor-General and Viceroy of India from 1936 to 1943. He was usually referred to simply as Linlithgow.

He served as vice president of the Royal Society of Edinburgh, Chancellor of the University of Edinburgh and Lord High Commissioner to the General Assembly of the Church of Scotland.

Early life and family
Hope was born at Hopetoun House, South Queensferry, Linlithgowshire, Scotland, on 24 September 1887.

He was the eldest son of John Adrian Louis Hope, 7th Earl of Hopetoun, later 1st Marquess Linlithgow, and Hersey Everleigh-de-Moleyns, Countess of Hopetoun and later Marchioness of Linlithgow, daughter of the fourth Baron Ventry. His godmother was Queen Victoria.

He was educated at Ludgrove School and Eton College and on 29 February 1908 succeeded his father as 2nd Marquess of Linlithgow.

In 1912, aged only 25, he was elected a Fellow of the Royal Society of Edinburgh. His proposers were William Turner, Alexander Crum Brown, Cargill Gilston Knott and James Haig Ferguson. He served as the society's vice president from 1934 to 1937.

Early career
Linlithgow served as an officer on the Western Front during the First World War. Transferred from Lothians and Border Horse, he commanded a battalion of the Royal Scots. He was mentioned in dispatches and appointed an Officer of the Order of the British Empire, ending the war with the rank of colonel.

He then served in various minor roles in the Conservative governments of the 1920s and '30s. From 1922 till 1924 he served as the civil lord of the Admiralty, becoming chairman of the Unionist Party Organisation in 1924 for two years. He also served as president of the Navy League from 1924 until 1931. He was chairman of the Medical Research Council and of the governing body of the Imperial College London. Linlithgow was also chairman of the committee on the distribution and prices of agricultural produce and president of the Edinburgh and East of Scotland College of Agriculture until 1933. In 1926 he was chairman of the Royal Commission on Agriculture in India, which published its findings in 1928. Influenced by submissions to the Royal Commission, "a decade later, when (he) became Viceroy of India he showed a personal interest in nutrition, pushing it to the top of the research agenda". The reason for sending a Commission on Agriculture under Linlithgow was 'because constitutional reform without economic and educational reform will do nothing to ameliorate the condition of life of the mass of the population of India, and this is what matters most.'

From April 1933 to November 1934 he was chairman of the Parliamentary Joint Select Committee on Indian constitutional reform, drawn up to consider the proposals for Indian self-government contained in the government's March 1933 White Paper. He agreed to take the job after Lord Salisbury declined it (although he agreed to serve on the committee) and Sidney Peel, the second choice, fell ill with phlebitis. Linlithgow told the Joint Select Committee that he would show no favouritism between the Indian factions (Hindus, Muslims and Princely States) and would be neutral just as he was between his own five children. The committee's proposals became the Government of India Act 1935.

Viceroy

Having previously declined both the governorship of Madras and the governor-generalship of Australia (his father was the first Governor-General of Australia), he became the Viceroy of India, succeeding Lord Willingdon. Travelling out to India on the P&O liner RMS Strathmore, he arrived in Bombay, with his wife, daughters, and personal staff, on 17 April 1936. Linlithgow implemented the plans for local self-government embodied in the Government of India Act 1935, which led to provincial governments led by the Congress Party in five of the eleven provinces of British India, but the recalcitrance of the princes prevented the establishment of elected governments in most of the princely states.

With the outbreak of the Second World War, Linlithgow's rejection of the request by the Congress for a declaration that India would be given the chance to determine its own future after the war led to the resignation of the Congress ministries. He declared India to be at war with Germany in September 1939, without consulting Indian politicians. On 8 August 1940 Lord Linlithgow made a statement on behalf of the British government. It was known as the August Offer and offered greater rights in the governance of India to the Indian people. The proposal was rejected by most Indian politicians, including the Congress Party and the Muslim League. Disputes between the British administration and Congress ultimately led to massive Indian civil disobedience in the Quit India Movement. Linlithgow suppressed the disturbances and arrested the Congress leaders. Some historians have partly blamed Linlithgow for the Bengal famine of 1943 which resulted in three million deaths.

Retirement

His seven-year tenure as viceroy, the longest in the history of the Raj, ended in 1943.

Indians were less kind in their assessments of his career. V. P. Menon in The Transfer of Power in India stated: "His 7½ year regime – longer than that of any other Viceroy – was conspicuous by its lack of positive achievement. When he left India, famine stalked portions of the countryside. There was economic distress due to the rising cost of living and the shortage of essential commodities. On the political side, Sir Tej Bahadur Sapru expressed the general feeling thus: 'Today, I say, after seven years of Lord Linlithgow's administration the country is much more divided than it was when he came here'."

A sincere Presbyterian, he served as Lord High Commissioner to the Church of Scotland in 1944 and 1945. He died in 1952.

Styles
1887–1902: Victor Alexander John Hope, Viscount Aithrie
1902–1908: Victor Alexander John Hope, Earl of Hopetoun
1908–1917: The Most Honourable The Marquess of Linlithgow
1917–1919: The Most Honourable The Marquess of Linlithgow, TD
1919–1928: The Most Honourable The Marquess of Linlithgow, OBE, TD
1928–1929: The Most Honourable The Marquess of Linlithgow, KT, OBE, TD
1929–1935: The Most Honourable The Marquess of Linlithgow, KT, GCIE, OBE, TD
1935–1936: The Most Honourable The Marquess of Linlithgow, KT, GCIE, OBE, TD, PC
1936–1943: His Excellency The Most Honourable The Marquess of Linlithgow, Viceroy and Governor-General of India, KT, GCSI, GCIE, OBE, TD, PC
1943–1952: The Most Honourable The Marquess of Linlithgow, KG, KT, GCSI, GCIE, OBE, TD, PC
in Scotland: May 1944, May 1945: His Grace The Lord High Commissioner

Honours
:
 Knight of the Most Noble Order of the Garter (KG)
 Knight Companion of the Most Ancient and Most Noble Order of the Thistle (KT)
 Knight Grand Commander of the Most Exalted Order of the Star of India (GCSI)
 Knight Grand Commander of the Most Eminent Order of the Indian Empire (GCIE)
 Officer of the Most Excellent Order of the British Empire (OBE)
 Recipient of the Territorial Decoration (TD)

Family

On 19 April 1911 he married Doreen Maud Milner (1886–1965), the younger daughter of Sir Frederick Milner. They had twin sons and three daughters:
Charles William Frederick Hope, 3rd Marquess of Linlithgow (7 April 1912 – 1987); succeeded to his father's marquessate
John Adrian Louis Hope, 1st Baron Glendevon (7 April 1912 – 18 January 1996); became a Conservative statesman and married the daughter of the English novelist W. Somerset Maugham
Lady Anne Adeline (27 January 1914 – 2007)
Lady Joan Isabella (21 September 1915 – 1989)
Lady Doreen Hersey Winifred (17 June 1920 – 22 January 1997), the mother of Lucinda Green, a famous equestrian.

In some circles the three girls were known as Faint Hope, Little Hope, and No Hope.

References

External links

 

Viceroys of India
1930s in British India
1940s in British India
Lords of the Admiralty
World War II political leaders
1887 births
1952 deaths
British Army personnel of World War I
Royal Scots officers
Scottish Presbyterians
Knights of the Garter
Knights of the Thistle
Lord-Lieutenants of West Lothian
Members of the Privy Council of the United Kingdom
Knights Grand Commander of the Order of the Star of India
Knights Grand Commander of the Order of the Indian Empire
Officers of the Order of the British Empire
Chancellors of the University of Edinburgh
Victor
Lords High Commissioner to the General Assembly of the Church of Scotland
Deputy Lieutenants of Linlithgowshire
India in World War II
Unionist Party (Scotland) politicians
People from South Queensferry
Scottish agriculturalists
Marquesses of Linlithgow
Politicians from Edinburgh
People educated at Ludgrove School